Shomrim is a Hebrew word meaning "watchers" or "guards" and may refer to:

 Shomrim (neighborhood watch group), Orthodox Jewish civilian volunteer patrols
 Shomrim (fraternal police organization), an organization of Jewish members of the New York City Police Department or subsequently formed chapters chartered under the National Conference of Shomrim Societies.
 Shomer, a custodian in Jewish law, singular of shomrim
 Shemira, the Jewish custom of watching over a dead body before burial; watchers are known as shomrim
 Hashomer (Hebrew: השומר, "The Watchman"), a Jewish defense organization in Palestine 
 Hashomer Hatzair youth movement